Parliamentary elections were held in Brazil on 15 November 1966. They were the first elections held after a military coup in 1964. In 1965 the military government of President Humberto de Alencar Castelo Branco dissolved all existing parties, and enacted a new electoral law that effectively limited the number of parties to two — the pro-government National Renewal Alliance (ARENA) and the opposition Brazilian Democratic Movement.  

ARENA won a landslide victory, taking 277 of the 409 seats in the Chamber of Deputies and 19 of the 23 seats in the Senate. Voter turnout was 77.2% in the Chamber of Deputies election and 77.3% in the Senate election.

Results

Chamber of Deputies

Senate

References

General elections in Brazil
Brazil
Legislative
Brazil